Elegia miserabilis is a species of moth of the family Pyralidae. It was described by Embrik Strand in 1919 and is found in Taiwan.

References

Moths described in 1919
Phycitini